The Lamborghini Asterion LPI 910-4 (LPI being an abbreviation for Longitudinale Posteriore Ibrido) is a concept hybrid car manufactured by Italian automobile manufacturer Lamborghini, which was unveiled at the 2014 Paris Motor Show. The car is named after a Minotaur called Asterion and was to be Lamborghini's first hybrid model. The half man – half bull Minotaur was chosen keeping in mind Lamborghini's tradition of naming their cars after a bull while alluding to its usage of different modes of power.

Specifications and performance 
The batteries are placed in the central shaft, which improves the car's safety and center of gravity. The car features a torque vectoring system, a system typical on hybrid sports cars.

The hybrid technology adds  to the overall weight of the car.

The car has a sharp angular design and has a carbon-fibre monocoque borrowed from the Aventador along with carbon-fiber composite plastic body panels. The interior has a minimalistic layout and has ivory leather upholstery and has a carbon-fiber, aluminium and titanium trim with the seats placed higher and the windshield more vertical than traditional Lamborghini models in order for additional comfort, signifying the grand touring nature of the car.

The Asterion also has more storage space than the typical Lamborghini models. It contains three driving modes namely "Zero" (full electric mode), "Ibrido" (which runs the car on the combined power of the engine and the electric motors) and "Termico" (which runs the car on the engine only). The modes can be selected via buttons on the steering wheel.

Cancellation 
The car, which was to become Lamborghini's first hybrid model, was introduced as a 'technology demonstrator'. Stephan Winkelmann, then President and CEO of Lamborghini, stated in an interview with Autocar that the Asterion would not enter production and was being shelved in favor of the Urus SUV. According to him, it was done on the basis of customer reaction which favored hybrid technology only if it came with added performance. The car was planned to compete with similar hybrid cars, including the McLaren P1 and the Porsche 918 Spyder.

Other media 
The car made its video game debut in the racing video game Real Racing 3 in a 2015 update.
The car is also featured in Gameloft's Asphalt 8: Airborne and Asphalt 9: Legends.

Gallery

References

External links 

Asterion
2010s cars
Grand tourers
Rear mid-engine, all-wheel-drive vehicles